The 2022–23 LIU Sharks men's basketball team represented Long Island University in the 2022–23 NCAA Division I men's basketball season. The Sharks, led by first-year head coach Rod Strickland, played their home games at the Steinberg Wellness Center in Brooklyn, New York as members of the Northeast Conference.

Previous season
The Sharks finished the 2021–22 season 16–14, 12–6 in NEC play to finish in third place. As the No. 3 seed, they defeated No. 6 seed Sacred Heart in the quarterfinals of the NEC tournament, before falling to No. 2 seed Wagner.

On June 30, the school announced the firing of head coach Derek Kellogg, after 5 season at the helm. They immediately named NBA G League Ignite program manager Rod Strickland as the Sharks' next head coach.

Roster

Schedule and results

|-
!colspan=12 style=| Non-conference regular season

|-
!colspan=12 style=| NEC regular season

|-
!colspan=9 style=| NEC Tournament

Sources

References

LIU Sharks men's basketball seasons
LIU
LIU
LIU